Warren William (born Warren William Krech; December 2, 1894 – September 24, 1948) was a Broadway and Hollywood actor, immensely popular during the early 1930s; he was later nicknamed the "King of Pre-Code". He was the first actor to play Perry Mason.

Early life
Warren William Krech's family originated in Bad Tennstedt, Thuringia, Germany. His grandfather, Ernst Wilhelm Krech (born 1819), fled Germany in 1848 during the Revolution, going first to France and later emigrating to the United States. He wed Mathilde Grow in 1851, and had six children. Freeman E. Krech, Warren's father, was born in 1856. Around the age of 25, Freeman moved to Aitkin, a small town in Minnesota, where he bought a newspaper, The Aitkin Age, in 1885. He married Frances Potter, daughter of a merchant, September 18, 1890. Their son Warren was born December 2, 1894.

Warren William's interest in acting began in 1903, when an opera house was built in Aitkin. He was an avid and lifelong amateur inventor and was personally involved in working his farm,  pursuits that may have contributed to his death by exposing him to a variety of dangerous contaminants, ranging from sawdust to DDT.  After high school, William auditioned for, and was enrolled in, the American Academy of Dramatic Arts (AADA) in New York City in October 1915.

As his senior year at AADA was coming to an end, the United States had entered the First World War, and William enlisted in the United States Army. He was assigned from base to base, in charge of training new men at various locations, and in 1918 was assigned to Fort Dix, New Jersey, near New York City. During this period, he met his future wife, Helen Barbara Nelson, who was 17 years older than he was. In October 1918, William's unit was deployed to the war front in France, and the war ended one month later. William's military service ended 1919, after which he began working on his acting career. In 1923, he and Helen were married.

Career

William, who appeared in his first Broadway play in 1920, soon made a name for himself in New York, appearing in more than 20 plays on Broadway between 1920 and 1931. During this period he also appeared in two silent films, The Town That Forgot God (1922) and Plunder (1923).

He moved from New York City to Hollywood in 1931. Looking back at his career in 2011, The Village Voice christened him "The King of Pre-Code". He  began as a contract player at Warner Bros. and quickly became a star during what is now known as the 'Pre-Code' period. He developed a reputation for portraying ruthless, amoral businessmen (Under 18, Skyscraper Souls, The Match King, Employees' Entrance), crafty lawyers (The Mouthpiece, Perry Mason), and outright charlatans (The Mind Reader). These roles were considered controversial, yet they were highly satisfying. This was the harshest period of the Great Depression, characterized by massive business failures and oppressive unemployment. Movie audiences jeered at the businessmen, who were often portrayed as predators.

William did play some sympathetic roles, including Dave the Dude in Frank Capra's Lady for a Day and a loving father and husband cuckolded by Ann Dvorak's character in Three on a Match (1932). He was a young songwriter's comically pompous older brother in Golddiggers of 1933. William was Julius Caesar in Cecil B. DeMille's Cleopatra (1934; starring Claudette Colbert in the title role), and with Colbert again the same year as her character's love interest in Imitation of Life (1934). He played the swashbuckling musketeer d'Artagnan in The Man in the Iron Mask (1939), directed by James Whale.

The studios capitalized on William's popularity by placing him in multiple "series" films, particularly as detectives and crime solvers. William was the first to portray Erle Stanley Gardner's fictional defense attorney Perry Mason on the big screen, starring in four Perry Mason mysteries. He played Raffles-like reformed jewel thief The Lone Wolf in nine films, beginning with The Lone Wolf Spy Hunt (1939), and appeared as Detective Philo Vance in two of the series films, The Dragon Murder Case (1934) and the comedic The Gracie Allen Murder Case (1939). He also starred as Sam Spade (renamed Ted Shane) in Satan Met a Lady (1936), the second screen version of The Maltese Falcon.

Other roles included Mae West's manager in Go West, Young Man (1936); a jealous district attorney in another James Whale film, Wives Under Suspicion (1938); copper magnate Jesse Lewisohn in 1940's Lillian Russell; the evil Jefferson Carteret in Arizona (also 1940); and the sympathetic Dr. Lloyd in The Wolf Man (1941). In 1945, he played Brett Curtis in cult director Edgar G. Ulmer's 1945 modern-day version of Hamlet, called Strange Illusion.  In what would be his last film, he played Laroche-Mathieu in The Private Affairs of Bel Ami in 1947.

On radio, William starred in the transcribed series Strange Wills, which featured "stories behind strange wills that run the gamut of human emotion."

Private life and death
Although on-screen William was an actor audiences loved to hate, off-screen William was a private man, and he and his wife, Helen, kept out of the limelight. Warren and Helen remained a couple throughout his entire adult life. He was often described as having been shy in real life. Co-star Joan Blondell once said, "[He] ... was an old man – even when he was a young man."

Warren William died on September 24, 1948, from multiple myeloma, at age 53. His wife died a few months later. He was recognized for his contribution to motion pictures with a star on the Hollywood Walk of Fame in February 1960.

Filmography

Stage
Note: The list below is limited to New York/Broadway theatrical productions; listed as Warren William, except where noted

Bibliography

References

External links

 
 
 

1894 births
1948 deaths
People from Aitkin, Minnesota
American male stage actors
American male film actors
American male silent film actors
Deaths from multiple myeloma
Deaths from cancer in California
Male actors from Minnesota
Warner Bros. contract players
20th-century American male actors
American people of German descent